Liberty Plaza is a public plaza in downtown Atlanta, Georgia, adjacent to the Georgia State Capitol. Completed in 2015, the 2.2-acre plaza is capable of holding over 3,000 people and has hosted numerous political demonstrations in Atlanta.

History 
The idea of a public greenspace near the Georgia State Capitol dates back to 1910, when a tree-lined boulevard approaching the capitol was proposed. This proposal, an example of the City Beautiful movement, was made by Atlanta-based architect Haralson Bleckley and would have seen the Gulch capped by a broad civic plaza extending from the Capitol to Terminal Station. This "Bleckley Plaza Plan" was rejected in 1916, and while it was revived in 1923, 1927, and 1930, all revivals were ultimately also rejected. Other proposals made in 1927, 1932, and 1944 called for a square plaza to be built between the Capitol and Atlanta City Hall, but like the previous proposals, these never came to fruition. Because of the lack of a plaza near the Capitol, most political demonstrations and inaugurations on the Capitol grounds were held near the western entrance of the Capitol on Washington Street, which often caused the road to be closed. Speaking of the lack of a public plaza near the Capitol in 2014, former member of the Georgia State Senate George Hooks said, "Our Capitol has probably the smallest amount of green space of any Capitol I know of in the country.”

Modern era
In 2008, Steve Fanczi (Deputy Executive Director of the Georgia Building Authority) developed and proposed plans for a public plaza to the east of the State Capitol called "Liberty Plaza". The plans were finally approved in the Fall of 2013 by the Governing Board of the Georgia Building Authority, with a cost of $4.4 million that was raised through the selling of surplus government property. With designs by architectural firm Stevens & Wilkinson, work on the plaza began on June 5, 2014 with the demolition of a 60-year-old parking garage just east of the Capitol. Completed in 2015, the 2.2-acre public plaza includes an 8,000-square-foot grass lawn and is capable of holding over 3,000 people. While Governor Nathan Deal had originally intended for his inauguration to be held at the newly constructed plaza on January 12, 2015, bad weather forced the ceremony to take place inside the Capitol. Several days later on January 16, Deal officially dedicated the plaza. Deal also pledged that a statue of Martin Luther King Jr. would be constructed on the plaza.

Demonstration venue
Notable demonstrations that have occurred at the plaza include the March for Our Lives in 2018, a climate strike in September 2019, and the 2020 Georgia March for Life.

Controversy 
In 2018, a Federal lawsuit was filed by organizers of the March for Our Lives alleging that the requests process for holding a protest on the grounds was unconstitutional. The process required any event held after normal business hours on the grounds to be sponsored by a Constitutional officer of the state, which the organizers stated was a violation of their First Amendment rights. While the organizers were initially unable to receive a sponsorship from any of the Constitutional officers (who at the time, they pointed out, were all Republicans), Governor Nathan Deal eventually agreed to sponsor the protest. In response to this incident, the ACLU of Georgia sent a letter to the Georgia Building Authority (which operates the plaza) urging them to amend their policies regarding permits for holding political rallies and protests at the location.

Statues and reproductions
The plaza houses model reproductions of the Liberty Bell and the Statue of Liberty that were previously held elsewhere on the Capitol grounds. Surrounding the Liberty Bell is a ring of 13 state flags from the original Thirteen Colonies, as well as the U.S. flag and Liberty Plaza flag. A statue of Martin Luther King Jr. overlooking the plaza was unveiled on August 28, 2017, the 54th anniversary of King's I Have a Dream speech.

See also 
 Lawyers Mall, the greenspace in front of the Maryland State House
 Minnesota State Capitol Mall
 Capitol Grounds on Capitol Square, surrounding the Ohio Statehouse
 Capitol Mall, which borders the California State Capitol

References

Bibliography

Further reading

External links 
 

Parks in Atlanta